Edward Reed Fields (born September 30, 1932) is an American white supremacist and anti-Semitic political activist.

Biography
Fields was born in 1932 in Chicago, Illinois, and moved at an early age to Atlanta, Georgia, where he graduated from Catholic school. It was during this time he became active in far-right politics, and associated himself with the Black Front, a local Nazi organization, serving as a recruiter. Fields attended law school in Atlanta, but dropped out in 1953. Later, he attended the Palmer College of Chiropractic and graduated in 1957. Fields began practice as a chiropractor, although this occupation was soon overshadowed by his political activity.

Fields was active in several white supremacist political organizations, joining the Columbians, an anti-black and anti-Semitic group, in high school, and joining J. B. Stoner's Christian Anti-Jewish Party in 1952; he later served as its Executive Director. He was also a member of the American Anti-Communist Society in 1950 and 1951.

In 1958, Fields founded the National States' Rights Party, which advocated racial segregation and white supremacy; he served as its National Director while Stoner served as its National Chairman. Fields edited the party's newspaper, The Thunderbolt. During this time period, he frequently wrote to print publications detailing his beliefs, for instance in 1969 a letter by Fields was published in Playboy, alleging, "we will never have law and order in America until all Negroes are deported back to Africa and completely removed from this nation that was founded and built by the great white race."

Fields and the National States' Rights Party in 1963 were enlisted by Alabama Gov. George Wallace and state public safety chief Albert Lingo to create pretexts that Wallace used to order closed public schools that were slated for integration and to deploy state troopers—over the objections of local authorities—in communities otherwise determined to comply with federal court orders to desegregate.

In 1976, following Alabama Attorney General Bill Baxley's opening of prosecution against the bombers of the 16th Street Baptist Church in Birmingham, Fields wrote a letter to Baxley, referring to him as an "honorary nigger" and threatening to assassinate him. Baxley responded with his own letter the following day, telling Fields, "My response to your letter of February 19, 1976, is - kiss my ass."

Following J. B. Stoner's imprisonment for his involvement in the 1958 Bethel Baptist Church bombing, Fields lost the trust of many party members, largely due to his increasing activity with the Ku Klux Klan and decreasing involvement with the group, and was expelled from the party in August 1983. He continued publishing The Thunderbolt, but changed the newspaper's name to The Truth At Last. Fields founded the white supremacist America First Party in 1993, and spoke at the Populist Party's 1994 convention.

Fields attended the 2001 funeral of Klansman Byron De La Beckwith, who murdered civil rights activist Medgar Evers.

References

1932 births
Living people
20th-century far-right politicians in the United States
Neo-Nazi politicians in the United States
20th-century American newspaper publishers (people)
American chiropractors
American Holocaust deniers
American Ku Klux Klan members
People from Atlanta
People from Chicago
People from Marietta, Georgia
Palmer College of Chiropractic alumni
National States' Rights Party politicians